Hovde is a surname. Notable people with the surname include:

Arne Hovde (1914–1935), Norwegian ski jumper 
Carl Hovde (1926–2009), American educator
Dag Ivar Hovde (born 1973), Norwegian biathlete
Frederick L. Hovde (1908–1983), American university president
Jonny Hovde, Norwegian handball player
Kristian Hovde (1903–1969), Norwegian cross-country skier
William J. Hovde (1917–1996), United States Air Force colonel